The Cartoon History of the Universe is a book series about the history of the world. It is written and illustrated by American cartoonist, professor, and mathematician Larry Gonick, who started the project in 1978. Each book in the series explains a period of world history in a loosely chronological order. Though originally published as a comic book series, the series is now published in trade paperback volumes of several hundred pages each. The final volume covers history from the late 18th century to early 2008. The final two volumes, published in 2007 and 2009, are named The Cartoon History of the Modern World volumes one and two. The books have been translated into many languages, including Portuguese, Greek, Czech and Polish.

Publication history 
San Francisco-based underground comix publisher Rip Off Press began publishing The Cartoon History of the Universe in 1978, with the first six issues being published by 1981. Rip Off Press published 9 issues from 1978 to 1992; the first collected edition was published by Doubleday in 1990.

While seeking a book publisher, Gonick received early support from Jacqueline Kennedy Onassis, who worked as an editor at Doubleday and championed The Cartoon History of the Universe'''s publication by the company.

 Illustration style The Cartoon History is illustrated in a black-and-white cartoon style. Gonick occasionally uses crosshatching and other realistic drawing techniques, but he primarily draws with a lively brush-and-ink squiggle that resembles Bill Watterson's Calvin and Hobbes, Walt Kelly's Pogo, and René Goscinny and Albert Uderzo's Astérix. Occasionally, as in the sequences on India in the second book, he mimics Gilbert Shelton's style from The Fabulous Furry Freak Brothers.

His tribute to Asterix is explicit. When Gauls are depicted, not only do they often resemble Goscinny and Uderzo's characters Asterix and Obelix, but when Gonick treats the Gallic invasion of Italy (390 – 387 BCE), the characters, along with Vitalstatistix, appear unmistakably (Vitalstatistix is transported on a shield, Asterix pummels a Roman soldier, etc.); and as they trudge off into the sunset, the speech balloon reads "Come on, Asterix! Let's get our own comic book".

 Narrative framework 
Each volume or chapter begins with a one- or two-panel introduction. An Einstein-like Professor (representing Gonick's authorial voice) prepares to travel in his time machine to whatever place or era the chapter is about. The Professor reads a passage from a historical book, which activates the "time machine", a literary device. For example, the Professor reads a book about dinosaurs to introduce Volume 1 about prehistory. He reads from Hans Zinsser's Rats, Lice and History before Volume 19 about the Black Death. This introduction provides a bridge to the action, the main narrative of each chapter.

 Narrative style and tone 
 Point of view 
Any history book has a point of view, and Larry Gonick's might best be described as "humanist", but it is not written in the style of a didactic textbook. Instead, Gonick fleshes out history into a long yarn, injecting characterization into historical personages, continually reporting gory anecdotes, and focusing on quirky details—all backed up by research—to enliven his subject. He reports both the greatness of human achievement and acknowledges humanity's savagery.

In addition to being a straight (though unusual) history, The Cartoon History helps readers understand historical cause and effect—how the past relates to the present. It explains the motivations behind human beings' discoveries, inventions, explorations, wars, triumphs, and mistakes. Gonick's editorial aim seeks to do justice to every point of view.

 Humor 
Gonick consistently uses elements of satire to find the most humor in every situation. For example, one cartoon panel depicts the barbarism of a group of Huns who had elephants herded off a cliff for their sadistic enjoyment. One Hun exclaims with an oafish grin, "My emotions are valid!"—juxtaposing the Hun's brutal barbarism with an anachronistic, post-modern view of his own cruelty [3].

Also noteworthy is Gonick's use of caricature. For example, he depicts the weaselly Robert Guiscard, the 11th-century Norman adventurer, as an anthropomorphic weasel, an allusion to Guiscard's name and cunning nature, and depicts Babur, the 16th-century founder of the Mughal Empire with buckteeth (an allusion to the theory that the conqueror's name means "beaver").

 Unorthodox citations 
Consistently enthusiastic in tone, Gonick uses each collection's bibliography to promote historical literacy. At the end of each published collection, Gonick thoroughly cites his sources. But rather than relying upon an ordinary, typeset bibliography, Gonick sustains his unorthodox style and exuberant tone as the Professor takes the reader through a cartoon tour of his sources.

Because much of The Cartoon History covers evolutionary science, physics, astronomy, and ancient history, Gonick has referenced original writings on these subjects, rather than relying on secondary sources or anthologies. Some of these primary sources are national epics, cultural writings, or holy scriptures, such as Homer's Iliad, the Rig Veda of India, and the Bible. In this way he prompts his readers also to read the primary sources.

The series
Beginning with its original comic book Volume 1'' in 1977, the complete series covers world history through 2008.

References

External links 

 

1978 comics debuts
Historical comics
Comics about time travel
Educational comics
Humor comics
1990 books
20th-century history books
Universal history books
American comics titles
Series of books
Books about civilizations
Non-fiction comics
Harvey Award winners for Best Graphic Album of Original Work